Hans-Heinz Dräger (6 December 1909 – 9 November 1968), complete name Hans-Heinz Gerhard Kurt Dräger, was a German-American musicologist. He died in November 1968 at age 58.

Life and career 
Born in Stralsund, Dräger attended the secondary school in Stralsund from 1920 to 1931. From 1931 to 1937, he studied musicology at the Humboldt-Universität zu Berlin with Friedrich Blume, Curt Sachs, Arnold Schering, Georg Schünemann and Erich Schumann.

After obtaining his doctorate in 1937, he was offered a post as an assistant at the State Institute for Music Research. In 1938, he became assistant to the director of the Berlin Musical Instrument Museum. In 1939, he was appointed acting director of the museum.

After the Second World War, he went to the University of Kiel where he was habilitated in 1946. In 1947, he was appointed professor at the University of Greifswald, after which he taught at the University of Rostock until 1949. Afterwards he was professor at the Humboldt University of Berlin until 1953. Then he left the German Democratic Republic and was professor at the Free University of Berlin until 1961. In 1955, he was employed by RIAS as a music specialist and expert in musicology. From September 1955 to May 1956, he was a visiting professor at Stanford University as part of the Fulbright Program. In 1961, he accepted a visiting professorship at the University of Texas at Austin. There he took over the chair for systematic musicology in 1963.

In 1966, Draeger received the Citizenship of the United States. He was chairman of the Texan section of the American Musicological Society.

Draeger's main subject was description and musical instrument classification. For this purpose, he developed a set of tables in his habilitation thesis, in which all musical instruments were to be sorted according to a constant sequence of questions.

Dräger died in Austin (Texas) at age 58.

Work 
 Die Entwicklung des Streichbogens und seine Anwendung in Europa. (Promotion) Bärenreiter, Kassel 1937
 Article Amati, Blasinstrumentenbau, Bogen, Buhle, Casals, Dräger, Drehleier, Dynamik, Fidel, Gagliano Familie, Gasparo da Salò, Geige, Familie Grancino, Groblicz, Hackbrett, Instrumentenkunde, Janko, Kontrabaß, Mersenne, Monochord, Musette, Musik-Ästhetik A, Psalterium A and Tourte in Friedrich Blume (ed.): Die Musik in Geschichte und Gegenwart. Bärenreiter, Kassel 1949–1966
 Prinzip einer Systematik der Musikinstrumente. Bärenreiter, Kassel 1948

Literature 
 Dräger, Hans-Heinz. In Deutsche Biographische Enzyklopädie. K. G. Saur, Berlin, Boston 2011. (Verlag Walter de Gruyter Online, 9 August 2015).
 Michael S. Morawski: Draeger, Hans-Heinz. In Laurie E. Jasinski (ed.): Handbook of Texas Music. Texas A&M University Press, 2012, (Google Books).
 University of Texas (Publ.): In memoriam Hans-Heinz Draeger. Austin 1968, (Online, PDF).

References

External links 

Hans-Heinz Dräger on Texas State Historical Association

Musicologists from Berlin
20th-century German musicologists
Academic staff of the University of Greifswald
Academic staff of the University of Rostock
University of Texas at Austin faculty
Academic staff of the Humboldt University of Berlin
Academic staff of the Free University of Berlin
1909 births
1968 deaths
People from Stralsund
German emigrants to the United States